Pamiria metallica, the small green underwing, is a butterfly in the family Lycaenidae. It is found in the Himalayas.

References

Butterflies described in 1865
Polyommatini
Butterflies of Asia
Taxa named by Baron Cajetan von Felder
Taxa named by Rudolf Felder